Mary Ann Wright may refer to:

 Mary Ann Wright (murderer) (1820–1860), American housewife convicted of poisoning
 Mary Ann Wright (Delaware) (1920–2006) in Hall of Fame of Delaware Women
 Mary Ann Wright (activist) (1921–2009), American humanitarian activist
 Mary Ann Wright (colonel) (born 1947), American colonel

See also
Mary Wright (disambiguation)
Ann Wright (disambiguation)
Wright (surname)